is a passenger railway station located in the city of Mimasaka, Okayama Prefecture, Japan, operated by West Japan Railway Company (JR West).

Lines

Station layout
The station consists of two ground-level island platforms connected by a level crossing. The wooden station building is on the side of Platform 2. The station is attended.

Platforms

History
Mimasaka-Emi Station opened on November 28, 1934.  With the privatization of the Japan National Railways (JNR) on April 1, 1987, the station came under the aegis of the West Japan Railway Company. A new station building was completed in February 2021.

Passenger statistics
In fiscal 2019, the station was used by an average of 51 passengers daily..

Surrounding area
Mimasaka City Sakuto General Branch
Mimasaka Municipal Sakuhigashi Junior High School
Chugoku Expressway - Sakuto Bus Stop

See also
List of railway stations in Japan

References

External links

 Mimasaka-Emi Station Official Site

Railway stations in Okayama Prefecture
Kishin Line
Railway stations in Japan opened in 1934
Mimasaka, Okayama